Birch bark or birchbark is the bark of several Eurasian and North American birch trees of the genus Betula.

The strong and water-resistant cardboard-like bark can be easily cut, bent, and sewn, which has made it a valuable building, crafting, and writing material, since pre-historic times. Today, birch bark remains a popular type of wood for various handicrafts and arts.

Birch bark also contains substances of medicinal and chemical interest. Some of those products (such as betulin) also have fungicidal properties that help preserve bark artifacts, as well as food preserved in bark containers.

Collection and storage

Removing birch bark from live trees is harmful to tree health and should be avoided. Instead, it can be removed fairly easily from the trunk or branches of dead wood, by cutting a slit lengthwise through the bark and pulling or prying it away from the wood. The best time for collection is spring or early summer, as the bark is of better quality and most easily removed.

Removing the outer (light) layer of bark from the trunk of a living tree may not kill it, but probably weakens it and makes it more prone to infections. Removal of the inner (dark) layer, the phloem, kills the tree by preventing the flow of sap to the roots.

To prevent it from rolling up during storage, the bark should be spread open and kept pressed flat.

Working

Birch bark can be cut with a sharp knife, and worked like cardboard. For sharp bending, the fold should be scored (scratched) first with a blunt stylus.

Fresh bark can be worked as is; bark that has dried up (before or after collection) should be softened by steaming, by soaking in warm water, or over a fire.

Uses

Birch bark was a valuable construction material in any part of the world where birch trees were available. Containers such as wrappings, bags, baskets, boxes, or quivers were made by most societies well before pottery was invented. Other uses include:
In various Asian countries (including Siberia) birch bark was used to make storage boxes, paper, tinder, canoes, roof coverings, tents, and waterproof covering for composite bows, such as the Mongol bow, the Chinese bow, Korean bow, Turkish bows, Assyrian bow, the Perso-Parthian bow. It is still being used. More than one variety of birch is used.
In North America, the native population used birch bark for canoes, wigwams, scrolls, ritual art (birch bark biting), maps (including the oldest maps of North America), torches, fans, musical instruments, clothing, and more.
In Scandinavia and Finland, it was used as the substratum of sod roofs and birch-bark roofs, for making boxes, casks and buckets, fishing implements, and shoes (as used by the Egtved Girl) similar to bast shoes. 
In Russia, many birch bark manuscripts have survived from the Middle Ages.
Birch bark knife handles are popular tools to be made currently.
In India, birch-bark, along with dried palm leaves, were the primary writing supports before the widespread advent of paper in the second millennium CE. The oldest known Buddhist manuscripts (some of the Gandharan Buddhist Texts), from Afghanistan, were written on birch bark.
Neanderthals used birch bark to make a tar adhesive through the process of dry or destructive distillation. 

Birch bark also makes an outstanding tinder, as the inner layers will stay dry even through heavy rainstorms.

Medical uses 

Birch bark, sold under the brand name Filsuvez, is a medication that is used to treat epidermolysis bullosa (EB).

The most common side effects with Filsuvez include wound complications. Other common side effects include skin reactions at the application site, wound infections, pruritus (itching), and hypersensitivity (allergic) reactions.

Epidermolysis bullosa is an inherited disease of the skin that makes the skin very fragile and causes severe blistering and scarring. Filsuvez is used in two types of epidermolysis bullosa, dystrophic epidermolysis bullosa and junctional epidermolysis bullosa, to treat partial-thickness skin wounds. These are wounds where the upper layers of the skin have been damaged.

Filsuvez is indicated for the treatment of partial thickness wounds associated with dystrophic and junctional epidermolysis bullosa (EB) in people aged six months of age and older.

Legal status 
On 22 April 2022, the Committee for Medicinal Products for Human Use (CHMP) of the European Medicines Agency (EMA) adopted a positive opinion, recommending the granting of a marketing authorization for the medicinal product Filsuvez, intended for the treatment of epidermolysis bullosa (EB). The applicant for this medicinal product is Amryt Pharmaceuticals DAC. Filsuvez will be available as a gel for cutaneous use. The active substance of Filsuvez is birch bark extract (as dry extract, refined) from Betula pendula Roth/Betula pubescens Ehrh. (equivalent to 0.5‑1.0 g birch bark), including 84‑95 mg triterpenes calculated as the sum of betulin, betulinic acid, erythrodiol, lupeol and oleanolic acid. It is thought to work by modulating inflammatory mediators and stimulating keratinocyte differentiation and migration, thereby promoting wound healing and closure. Filsuvez was approved for medical use in the European Union in June 2022.

See also 
Mazinibaganjigan
Wiigwaasabak
Wiigwaasi-makak
Magewappa
Lapti

References

Further reading

External links 

Birchbark articles from the NativeTech site.
Birch and Birch Bark, an article by John Zasada at a University of Minnesota site.
Birch Bark Canoe page on the site of the Algonquins of Pikwàganagàn.
César's Bark Canoe—Watch a documentary on how to build a Birch bark canoe
Bureau of Catholic Indian Missions Digital Image Collection at Marquette University; keyword: birch bark.
Wiigwaasi-Jiimaan: These Canoes Carry Culture—Short documentary featuring the building of an Anishinaabe-Ojibwe birchbark canoe in Wisconsin.
 
 

Writing media
Non-timber forest products
Native American ethnobotany
Combination drugs
Orphan drugs